In computer science, marshalling or marshaling (US spelling) is the process of transforming the memory representation of an object into a data format suitable for storage or transmission. It is typically used when data must be moved between different parts of a computer program or from one program to another. 

Marshalling can be somewhat similar to or synonymous with serialization. Marshalling is describing an intent or process to transfer some object from a client to server. The intent of marshalling is to have the same object that is present in one running program be present in another running program; that is, an object on the client should be transferred to the server. Serialization does not necessarily have this same intent, since it is only concerned about transforming data, for example, into a stream of bytes. Marshalling and serialization might be done differently, but some form of serialization is usually used to do marshalling.

It simplifies complex communications, because it uses composite objects in order to communicate instead of primitive objects. The inverse process of marshalling is called unmarshalling (or demarshalling, similar to deserialization). An unmarshalling interface takes a serialized object and transforms it into an internal data structure.

The accurate definition of marshalling differs across programming languages such as Python, Java, and .NET, and in some contexts, is used interchangeably with serialization.

Comparison with serialization 
To "serialize" an object means to convert its state into a byte stream in such a way that the byte stream can be converted back into a copy of the object.

The term "marshal" is used for a specific type of "serialization" in the Python standard library – storing internal python objects:

In the Java-related , marshalling is used when serialising objects for remote invocation. An object that is marshalled records the state of the original object and it contains the codebase (codebase here refers to a list of URLs where the object code can be loaded from, and not source code). Hence, in order to convert the object state and codebase(s), unmarshalling must be done. The unmarshaller interface automatically converts the marshalled data containing codebase(s) into an executable Java object in JAXB. Any object that can be deserialized can be unmarshalled. However, the converse need not be true.

In Microsoft .NET, marshalling is also used to refer to serialization when using remote calls:

Usage
Marshalling is used within implementations of different remote procedure call (RPC) mechanisms, where it is necessary to transport data between processes and/or between threads. In Microsoft's Component Object Model (COM), interface pointers must be marshalled when crossing COM apartment boundaries. In the .NET Framework, the conversion between an unmanaged type and a CLR type, as in the P/Invoke process, is also an example of an action that requires marshalling to take place.

Additionally, marshalling is used extensively within scripts and applications that use the XPCOM technologies provided within the Mozilla application framework. The Mozilla Firefox browser is a popular application built with this framework, that additionally allows scripting languages to use XPCOM through XPConnect (Cross-Platform Connect).

Example 
In the Microsoft Windows family of operating systems the entire set of device drivers for Direct3D are kernel-mode drivers. The user-mode portion of the API is handled by the DirectX runtime provided by Microsoft.

This is an issue because calling kernel-mode operations from user-mode requires performing a system call, and this inevitably forces the CPU to switch to "kernel mode". This is a slow operation, taking on the order of microseconds to complete. During this time, the CPU is unable to perform any operations. As such, minimizing the number of times this switching operation must be performed would optimize performance to a substantive degree.

Linux OpenGL drivers are split in two: a kernel-driver and a user-space driver. The user-space driver does all the translation of OpenGL commands into machine code to be submitted to the GPU. To reduce the number of system calls, the user-space driver implements marshalling. If the GPU's command buffer is full of rendering data, the API could simply store the requested rendering call in a temporary buffer and, when the command buffer is close to being empty, it can perform a switch to kernel-mode and add a number of stored commands all at once.

Formats 
XML is one means of transferring data between systems. Microsoft, for example, uses it as the basis of the file formats of the various components (Word, Excel, Access, PowerPoint, etc.) of the Microsoft Office suite (see Office Open XML). While this typically results in a verbose wire format, XML's fully-bracketed "start-tag", "end-tag" syntax allows provision of more accurate diagnostics and easier recovery from transmission or disk errors. In addition, because the tags occur repeatedly, one can use standard compression methods to shrink the content—all the Office file formats are created by zipping the raw XML. Alternative formats such as JSON (JavaScript Object Notation) are more concise, but correspondingly less robust for error recovery. 

Once the data is transferred to a program or an application, it needs to be converted back to an object for usage. Hence, unmarshalling is generally used in the receiver end of the implementations of Remote Method Invocation (RMI) and Remote procedure call (RPC) mechanisms to unmarshal transmitted objects in an executable form.

JAXB 
JAXB or Java Architecture for XML Binding is the most common framework used by developers to marshal and unmarshal Java objects. JAXB provides for the interconversion between fundamental data types supported by Java and standard XML schema data types.

XmlSerializer 
XmlSerializer is the framework used by C# developers to marshal and unmarshal C# objects. One of the advantages of C# over Java is that C# natively supports marshalling due to the inclusion of XmlSerializer class. Java, on the other hand requires a non-native glue code in the form of JAXB to support marshalling.

XML and executable representation 
An example of unmarshalling is the conversion of an XML representation of an object to the default representation of the object in any programming language. Consider the following class.public class Student
{
    private char name[150];
    private int ID;
    public String getName()
    {
        return this.name;
    }
    public int getID()
    {
        return this.ID;
    }
    void setName(String name)
    {
        this.name = name;
    }
    void setID(int ID)
    {
        this.ID = ID;
    }
}
 XML representation of Student object: 
<!-- Code Snippet 1 -->

<?xml version="1.0" encoding="UTF-8"?>
    <student id="11235813">
        <name>Jayaraman</name>
    </student>
    <student id="21345589">
        <name>Shyam</name>
    </student>
 Executable representation of Student object:
// Code Snippet 2

Student s1 = new Student();
s1.setID(11235813);
s1.setName("Jayaraman");
Student s2 = new Student();
s2.setID(21345589);
s2.setName("Shyam");

Unmarshalling converts the XML representation of Code Snippet 1 to the default executable Java representation of Code Snippet 2.

Unmarshalling in Java

Unmarshaller in JAXB 
The process of unmarshalling XML data into an executable Java object is taken care of by the in-built Unmarshaller class. The unmarshal methods defined in the Unmarshaller class are overloaded to accept XML from different types of input such as a File, FileInputStream, or URL. For example:
JAXBContext jcon = JAXBContext.newInstance("com.acme.foo");
Unmarshaller umar = jcon.createUnmarshaller();
Object obj = umar.unmarshal(new File("input.xml"));

Unmarshalling XML Data 
Unmarshal methods can deserialize an entire XML document or a small part of it. When the XML root element is globally declared, these methods utilize the JAXBContext's mapping of XML root elements to JAXB mapped classes to initiate the unmarshalling. If the mappings are not sufficient and the root elements are declared locally, the unmarshal methods use declaredType methods for the unmarshalling process. These two approaches can be understood below.

Unmarshal a global XML root element 

The unmarshal method uses JAXBContext to unmarshal the XML data, when the root element is globally declared. The JAXBContext object always maintains a mapping of the globally declared XML element and its name to a JAXB mapped class. If the XML element name or its @xsi:type attribute matches the JAXB mapped class, the unmarshal method transforms the XML data using the appropriate JAXB mapped class. However, if the XML element name has no match, the unmarshal process will abort and throw an UnmarshalException. This can be avoided by using the unmarshal by declaredType methods.

Unmarshal a local XML root element  

When the root element is not declared globally, the application assists the unmarshaller by application-provided mapping using declaredType parameters. By an order of precedence, even if the root name has a mapping to an appropriate JAXB class, the declaredType overrides the mapping. However, if the @xsi:type attribute of the XML data has a mapping to an appropriate JAXB class, then this takes precedence over declaredType parameter. The unmarshal methods by declaredType parameters always return a JAXBElement<declaredType> instance. The properties of this JAXBElement instance are set as follows:

See also 

 Free and open-source graphics device driver#Software architecture
 Component Object Model
 CORBA
 Pickle (Python)
 Protocol Buffers
 Java Architecture for XML Binding

References 

Persistence
Remote procedure call